Geobacter thiogenes  is a bacterium from the genus of Geobacter.

See also 
 List of bacterial orders
 List of bacteria genera

References

 

Bacteria described in 2001
Thermodesulfobacteriota